Abdirahman Mohamed Abdullahi (born 24 April 1955), also known as Irro, is a Somaliland politician, who served as speaker of Somaliland House of Representatives (lower chamber) of the first-elected parliament. He was elected to the position in November 2005 and served until August 2017. Abdullahi also previously co-founded the Justice and Welfare (UCID) party. He is likewise the founder and chairman of the Waddani party. He belongs to the Abukar Logeh branch of the Musa Abdallah subclan of the Habr Yunis.

Career

Early career

Professionally, Abdullahi worked at the Settlement Development Agency (Dan-wadaagaha) in different parts of Somalia. From 1981, he took on a position in the foreign service of the Somali Democratic Republic. Abdullahi also served in the Somali Embassy as the first consular in Moscow, which covered the entire Soviet Union. In 1991, he was re-appointed as Somalia's acting Ambassador to the Soviet Union. In this capacity, Abdullahi assisted the many Somali expatriates who had left Somalia following outbreak of the civil war. He later relocated to Finland in 1996 to join his family, who had moved there a few years prior, and subsequently received Finnish citizenship. He belongs to the Abukar Logeh branch of the Musa Abdallah subclan of the Habr Yunis.

UCID Party

In 2002, Abdullahi jointly formed the For Justice and Development (UCID) political party with Faysal Ali Warabe, a political association aimed at assisting in the reconstruction process in Somaliland. He was subsequently elected in the 2005 Somaliland parliamentary election to represent the UCID party in Sahil.  

The UCID political party was the first opposition party formally formed in Somaliland after the ruling UDUB party, while other politicians generally focused their opposition against the region's incumbent Egal administration (AHN). UCID also supported the referendum which put the foundation for the multi-party system, a process which many politicians have opposed and saw favouring Egal (AHN).

2005 Somaliland parliamentary election

Somaliland held elections to an 82-member House of Representatives on 29 September 2005. It was the first multi-party parliamentary election conducted in Somaliland since 1991, when the civil war began.

2017 Somaliland presidential election

The 2017 Somaliland presidential election was the third direct presidential election since 2003, held nominally on 13 November 2017. The result was a victory for ruling Kulmiye party candidate Muse Bihi Abdi, who received 55% of the vote. Muse Bihi Abdi defeated Abdirahman Mohammed Abdullahi.

References

Living people
Speakers of the House of Representatives (Somaliland)
Somaliland politicians
1955 births
People from Hargeisa
Somalian emigrants to Finland
Finnish people of Somali descent
Naturalized citizens of Finland